Deutsche Grammophon (DGG) is a German classical music record label that was the precursor of the corporation PolyGram. Headquartered in Berlin Friedrichshain, it is now part of Universal Music Group (UMG) since its merger with the UMG family of labels in 1999. It is the oldest surviving established record company.

History

Deutsche Grammophon Gesellschaft was founded in 1898 by German-born United States citizen Emile Berliner as the German branch of his Berliner Gramophone Company. Berliner sent his nephew Joseph Sanders from America to set up operations. Based in the city of Hanover (the founder's birthplace), the company was the German affiliate of the U.S. Victor Talking Machine Company and the British Gramophone Company, and, from 1900, a fully owned subsidiary of the latter, but that ended after the outbreak of World War I in 1914 when ownership reverted to Germany. Though no longer connected to the British Gramophone Company, Deutsche Grammophon continued to use the "His Master's Voice" trademark featuring the dog Nipper in Germany until the late 1940s.

In 1941, Deutsche Grammophon was purchased by the Siemens & Halske electronics company.

In 1949, Deutsche Grammophon sold the German rights of the His Master's Voice trademark to the Electrola unit of EMI.  The dog and gramophone were replaced by the crown of tulips, designed by Siemens advertising consultant Hans Domizlaff.

In 1962, Siemens formed a joint venture with Netherlands-based Philips to create the DGG/PPI Record Group, which became PolyGram Records in 1972. By this time, DGG had built a reputation for high-quality recording in the classical field as well as a notable roster of contracted singers, musicians, and conductors. Through its subsidiary label Archiv Produktion it also stimulated interest in Western medieval and renaissance music, 15th–16th century choral polyphony, Gregorian chant, and pioneering use of 'historical instruments'  and performance practices in recordings.

DGG/Polydor's entrance into the US market in 1969 (DGG had distribution deals in the US with Decca Records and MGM Records beforehand) came at a time when the big US classical music labels RCA Victor Red Seal and Columbia Masterworks were dropping most of their unlucrative classical artists and pressing inferior quality records. The fine quality both of recording and of pressings helped DGG succeed in America and attract artists such as Arthur Fiedler and the Boston Pops Orchestra (who had recorded for RCA Victor since 1935) to DGG/Polydor. In 1987, Siemens sold off its interest in PolyGram, and Philips became the majority shareholder.  In 1998, the Seagram company of Canada purchased Deutsche Grammophon and PolyGram on behalf of its Universal Music Group subsidiary. Since then, UMG was sold and became a division of Vivendi until its IPO in September 2021.

Deutsche Grammophon pioneered the introduction of the compact disc to the mass market, debuting classical music performed by Herbert von Karajan and the Berlin Philharmonic for sale in the new medium in 1983, the first recording being Richard Strauss's Eine Alpensinfonie.

Deutsche Grammophon has a huge back catalogue of notable recordings. The company is reissuing a portion of it in its Originals series; compact disc releases are noted for their vinyl record stylized design. It is also releasing some of American Decca Records' albums from the 1940s and 1950s, such as those that Leonard Bernstein made for Decca in 1953, and the classic Christmas album that features Ronald Colman's starring in A Christmas Carol and Charles Laughton's narrating Mr. Pickwick's Christmas.  Along with the American Decca Records classical music catalogue, Deutsche Grammophon also manages the classical music catalogue of ABC Records, including Westminster Records which, along with American Decca, were part of MCA Records.

Although Deutsche Grammophon acquired the reputation of releasing mainstream classical recordings, from the 1960s onwards it released an increasing number of avant-garde recordings (initially under the Avant-Garde imprint), including Bruno Maderna, David Bedford, Cornelius Cardew, Luigi Nono and improvisations. It also released the majority of the compositions of Karlheinz Stockhausen until the composer bought the rights to the recordings and re-released them on his own label.  Other German composers associated with the label included Paul Hindemith and Hans Werner Henze.

Contemporary composers whose works were released by Deutsche Grammophon include Hildur Guðnadóttir,  Sofia Gubaidulina, Oliver Knussen, Mark-Anthony Turnage, Mohammed Fairouz, Péter Eötvös, Luigi Nono, Sven Helbig, Jonny Greenwood, Bryce Dessner, Witold Lutosławski, Philip Glass, Tori Amos and Max Richter.

The conductor most associated with the label is Herbert von Karajan. Other conductors under contract included Ferenc Fricsay, Carlos Kleiber, Karl Böhm, Karl Richter, Eugen Jochum, Rafael Kubelík, Leonard Bernstein, Pierre Boulez, Claudio Abbado, and Christian Thielemann. Recent signings include Long Yu, Yannick Nézet-Séguin, Gustavo Dudamel, Hera Hyesang Park, and Myung-whun Chung.

The label's  series features electronic adaptations of classical works.

References

External links
 
 

Deutsche Grammophon Records
German record labels
Labels distributed by Universal Music Group
Record labels established in 1898
1898 establishments in Germany
Companies based in Berlin